Sex O´Clock is a 2023 Czech television series directed by Karolína Zalabáková and Jan Bártek. It is produced by the production company Cinebonbon for Voyo. The script was written jointly by Karolína Zalabáková and Matěj Randár. Voyo's creative producer is Marta Fenclová. It started broadcast on Voyo on 10 March 2023.

Synopsis
The protagonist of the series is a teenager Adam who focuses on his dancing career and effort to finally lose his virginity while his father turns the whole family's life upside down with the revelation that he is gay and leaves his family for another man. This starts a chain full of unexpected events.

Cast and characters 
Maxmilián Kocek as Adam Anenský
Karolin Omastová as Kristýna
Petra Bučková as Judita Anenská
Sára Korbelová as Ema Anenská
Tom Sean Pšenička as David
Jan Révai as Michal Anenský
Csongor Kassai as Patrik
Leona Skleničková as Alice
Iva Kruntorádová as Monika
Jana Švandová as Greta
Lucie Siposová as Berta
Kristýna Leichtová as Dita
Viviean Machková as Kučavíková
Eva Podzimková as school psychologist
Jakub Žáček as George
Iva Pazderková as David's mom
Vojtěch Vodochodský as Koudy
Josef Carda as teacher Hilbert

References

External links 
 Official page
 Sex O´Clock on Voyo.cz
 

TV Nova (Czech TV channel) original programming
Czech comedy television series
Teen television series
2023 Czech television series debuts